The Hester E. Suydam Boarding House, at 209 W. River St. in Fromberg, Montana, was built in 1907.  It was listed on the National Register of Historic Places in 1993.

It is a two-story, hip-roofed clapboarded multiple dwelling building, resting upon a concrete foundation.  It has a full-width front porch, and a -story gabled wing to its rear.  Up to 1992, the only significant changes to the building were enclosures of its porches.

It was built for Mrs. Suydam, who had operated a boarding house in Gebo, Montana, but turnover of ownership of coal mines there contributed to her perceiving Fromberg to be a more stable location.  She arranged to have her boardinghouse building moved in 1906, but a wind storm destroyed it in transit.

The new building was designed to appear as a large single family house, "providing inhabitants with a homelike atmosphere".  According to its National Register nomination, "Those individuals to live at Mrs. Suydam's boarding house were reflective of Fromberg's diverse population base. For example, in 1910 occupants there included a teacher, sales clerk, carpenter, fireman, and miners. Beginning in 1914, the house was called the Suydam Hotel; Mrs. Suydam had permanent guests and rooms available for those just passing through Fromberg. The Treichlers, who owned the home in the 1930s and 1940s rented rooms to teachers employed at Fromberg's schools and offered rooms for travelers."

Note

References

Residential buildings on the National Register of Historic Places in Montana
Boarding houses
National Register of Historic Places in Carbon County, Montana
Residential buildings completed in 1907
1907 establishments in Montana